The Mississippi State–Ole Miss baseball rivalry is a college baseball rivalry between the Mississippi State Bulldogs baseball team of Mississippi State University, in Starkville, Mississippi and the Ole Miss Rebels baseball team of the University of Mississippi in Oxford, Mississippi.  The rivalry series has included a single neutral-site game since 1980, known first as the Mayor's Trophy and later as the Governor's Cup.  This game is in addition to the games played as part of the Southeastern Conference schedule.

Mayor's Trophy
Started in 1980 by then Jackson, Mississippi Mayor Dale Danks, Jr., the Mayor's Trophy game had been one of the most anticipated match-ups of the Mississippi college baseball season as it featured Ole Miss versus Mississippi State. In the first 25 editions, the game has drawn an average of 4,887 fans per game. The Mayor's Trophy series ended after the 2006 match-up and was replaced by The Governor's Cup.

Governor's Cup
With the 2007 season, the non-conference meeting between the two teams moved to Trustmark Park in Pearl, Mississippi – which is the home to the Mississippi Braves – and was begun anew as the two teams competed for the Governor's Cup for the first time.

2007 – As was the case with the Mayor's Trophy game, the two teams alternate serving as the designated home team. Mississippi, ranked #19, was the home team in the inaugural game on April 17, 2007. Mississippi State, ranked #15, won the game 14–9.
2008 – The unranked Bulldogs won again, 6–5, in 2008 in front of a Governor's Cup record 7,862 fans, taking a 2–0 lead in the Governor's Cup series over the #16 ranked Rebels.
2009 – The 17th ranked Mississippi Rebels took their first Governor's Cup on April 14, 2009 with an 8–1 victory. There was a crowd of 7,458 in attendance as Brett Bukvich recorded a career-high 11 strike-outs in six innings of work as he was named MVP. 7,458 is the 5th largest attendance mark recorded at Trustmark Park.
2010 – The 11th ranked Mississippi Rebels used strong pitching and steady hitting to edge Mississippi State 5–3 for their 2nd consecutive Governor's Cup victory. The MVP was Mississippi pitcher David Goforth.
2011 – Behind the strong pitching performances of Kendall Graveman, Chad Girodo, and Taylor Stark, Mississippi State rolled to a 6–1 victory over the Rebels to reclaim the cup in front of a crowd of 7,334.
2012 – The 22nd ranked Rebels struck out 16 Bulldog batters en route to a 6–3 victory in front of a rain-soaked crowd of 5533.
2013 – 16th ranked Mississippi State routed the 18th Ranked Mississippi by a score of 5–1 in front of a then stadium record crowd of 8,240.
2014 – 20th ranked Mississippi State defeated 12 ranked Mississippi 8–3 to claim back to back Governor's Cup wins for the first time since the 2007–2008 games. For the second year in a row, and the third time overall, both teams entered the game ranked in the top 25. The game once again set a Trustmark Park record with a crowd of 8,496.
2015 – Mississippi defeated Mississippi State 11–1.
2016 – The 3rd ranked Bulldogs defeated the 13th ranked Rebels 2–0 marking the first time that either team had been shutout since the series was renamed the Governor's Cup and the first shutout in the series since the Rebels won 1–0 in 2006.
2017 – The 11th ranked Bulldogs defeated the unranked Rebels 4–2, completing first 4-game sweep of the rebels since 1997.
2018 - The unranked Bulldogs defeated the 6th ranked Rebels 7-6 with a bottom of the 9th, walk-off 2-run double by Luke Alexander to clench their third straight Governor's Cup. The Bulldogs were 3-1 versus the Rebels during the 2018 season, winning the earlier SEC series at Dudy Noble Field to then 3rd ranked Rebels.
2020 - Canceled due to COVID-19
2021 - Canceled due to COVID-19

Game results

References

College baseball rivalries in the United States
Mississippi State Bulldogs baseball
Ole Miss Rebels baseball
1980 establishments in Mississippi